Salpingus is a genus of beetles belonging to the family Salpingidae.

The species of this genus are found in Europe.

Species:
 Salpingus denticollis Gyllenhal, 1813 
 Salpingus henricusmontemini Alekseev, 2013

References

Salpingidae